The third season of the History Channel television series Top Shot, commenced airing on August 9, 2011. The season contained twelve episodes, and was filmed over a period of 35 days in Santa Clarita, California. The season was won by Dustin Ellermann.

Gary Quesenberry, Alex Charvat, and Phil Morden returned for Top Shot: All-Stars. Charvat finished in 11th and Quesenberry finished in 3rd, while Morden was the season's winner.

Contestants

 *Mike Hughes was originally eliminated in 7th place. After Jake Zweig refused to compete in the elimination challenge when nominated, Mike took his place and defeated Phil Morden in the challenge to re-enter the competition.

Contestant progress

 The player's team won the team challenge (Episodes 1 - 8).
 The player(s) won an individual challenge (Episodes 9 - 12), earning immunity from elimination for the current round.
 The player's team lost the team challenge, but the player was not nominated for elimination (Episodes 1 - 8); the player(s) lost the individual challenge, but was not nominated for elimination (Episodes 9 - 11).
 The player was nominated for elimination, but won an elimination challenge (Episode 9 - 11); or the player finished in the bottom two but won a tiebreaker (Episode 12).
 The player lost an elimination challenge and was eliminated.
 The player voluntarily withdrew from the competition.
 The player won an elimination challenge to re-enter the competition.
 The player won the $100,000 grand prize and the title of Top Shot.
 The player came in second.

Episodes

Episode 1: "The Gauntlet"

No practice sessions were held for the preliminary and team challenges. The trainer for the elimination challenge was Jim "Long Hunter" Finch, cowboy shooting specialist.

 Repeating rifles were a significant advance over single-shot rifles for use in combat due to their greater rate of fire.

Episode 2: "Down and Dirty"

The trainer for both challenges was Craig Sawyer, Navy SEALs instructor and former sniper.

 Smith & Wesson's "M&P" stands for "military and police".  Its design is based on input from law enforcement and the military.

Episode 3: "Slug It Out"

The trainer for both challenges was Taran Butler, national/world pistol champion.

Episode 4: "The Bulldog Gatling"

The trainer for the team challenge was Spencer Hoglund, historical weapons expert and four-time national champion speed shooter. The trainer for the elimination challenge was Garry James, historical weapons expert.

 The original Gatling gun was invented in 1862 by Richard Gatling, a dentist by profession. There was a three-way tie between Chris, Michael, and Mark with 2 votes each. It was broken by Gary, who voted for Mark, and Cliff, who voted for Michael.

Episode 5: "Throwdown Showdown"

The trainer for the team challenge was Jack Dagger, primitive weapons expert. The trainer for the elimination challenge was Rick Pohlers, cannon expert.

 Hotchkiss Mountain Gun (France 1877) was used to devastating effect in the battle of San Juan Hill and Wounded Knee Massacre. (Contestants used two of the 1857 originals)

Episode 6: "Turn the Corner"

The trainer for both challenges was Jeff Gonzales, former Navy SEAL and counter-terrorism instructor. Iain Harrison and Chris Reed, the winners of Seasons 1 and 2, served as honorary team captains (Blue and Red, respectively) during practice for the team challenge and offered their own advice. A $5,000 donation was made to a charity selected by the captain of the winning team (the Make-A-Wish Foundation, Chris' choice; Iain had appeared on behalf of the Wounded Warrior Project).

Episode 7: "Tricked Out"

The trainer for both challenges was Jerry Miculek, holder of four revolver world speed records.

Before the practice sessions for the team challenge, Billy withdrew from the competition due to complications in his wife's pregnancy. Since this decision left the Red Team with one extra member, they were allowed to decide for themselves which player would be benched.

 The Schofield Revolver used in this challenge was referred to as the "Pinkerton Model" because the barrel was shortened to 5 inches so Pinkerton detectives could easily conceal it.

Episode 8: "Ramp It Up"

The trainer for both challenges was Chris Palmer, archery expert and world-class archer.

Episode 9: "Stacked"

The teams were dissolved at the start of this episode. All players received green shirts and began to compete directly against each other for the rest of the season. After the individual challenge, all players voted for one of the lowest performers. The top two vote-getters then competed in an elimination challenge as in earlier episodes.

The trainer for both challenges was Craig "Sawman" Sawyer, Navy SEALs instructor and former sniper.

 There was a second-place tie between Chris and Mike. Each fired one shot at a target; the one who hit closer to the center was safe from elimination.

Episode 10: "Odd Man Out"

The trainer for the individual challenge was Taran Butler, national/world pistol champion. The trainer for the elimination challenge was Michael Voigt, president and CEO of the United States Practical Shooting Association.

Jake resigned from the competition after being nominated. As the last individual shooter eliminated before him, Mike returned to compete alongside Phil in the elimination challenge.

Episode 11: "Wheel of Fire"

The trainer for both challenges was Matt Burkett, practical shooting expert and weapons manufacturer.

Episode 12: "Season Three Finale"
No practice sessions were held in this episode. Each of the final two shooters had his wife and a friend watch the final challenge.

Epilogue: Behind the Bullet
Premiering after the final episode, Top Shot Season Three Behind the Bullet, was a one-hour documentary involving behind-the-scene interviews and footage taken before, during, and after the season three competition. At the end of the episode, the show profiled each of the contestants, post-competition.

 Amanda Hardin is training for a fitness competition. She would like to try hunting with her compound bow.
 Sara Ahrens is blogging and writing for Women's Outdoor News. She'll be attending the Shot Show in Las Vegas.
 Drew Shprintz just returned from a hunting safari in Africa. He's been working on tactical defensive shooting.
 Mark Schneider went on a shopping spree with his Bass Pro Shops gift card. He's excited to use his new gear on hunting trips.
 Jarret Grimes has been competing in the IDPA circuit. He recently returned from the Georgia State Championships.
 Paul Marinaccio is back on duty in his community which was ravaged by Hurricane Irene.
 Billy Rogers and his wife welcomed their healthy baby boy, Junior into the world. Billy competes locally in California.
 Michael Marelli has been giving private skeet and trap shooting lessons. He gave his Bass Pro Shops gift card to his grandfather.
 Cliff Walsh competed in October with the U.S. Revolver Team at the World Championships in Greece.
 Jake Zweig and his wife are expecting a baby in November. He currently coaches running backs at Bryant University in Rhode Island.
 Phil Morden started Run-N-Gun Productions, reviewing gear and firearms in web videos and DVD's.
 Alex Charvat has been shooting sporting clays with friends. He plans to enter upcoming USPSA competitions.
 Chris Collins has been working as a self-employed firearms instructor.
 Gary Quesenberry purchased a recurve bow. He is looking forward to deer hunting season with his brothers.
 Mike Hughes competed at the USPSA Production Nationals in September. He plans to start practicing three-gun.
 Dustin Ellermann has been busy with summer camp and retreat season. He plans on using his winnings to buy a new house for his growing family, including new daughter, Arrow.

Nomination Range

Episode 4: 3-way tie between Michael, Mark, and Chris; Gary and Cliff were chosen to break it by casting one more vote apiece.
Episode 9: 2-way tie between Mike and Chris; Chris won a shoot-off to avoid the elimination challenge.
Episode 10: After being nominated for the elimination challenge, Jake nailed his own plaque to the wall and quit the show. At practice the next morning, Donaldson announced that according to the rules, the last eliminated shooter would take his place. Mike therefore returned to the show and competed against Phil, winning the elimination challenge and re-entering the competition.

References

2011 American television seasons